Leojo Davidson (born 18 December 2003) is a Jamaican professional footballer who plays as a forward for Sheffield Wednesday.

Career

Sheffield Wednesday
On 12 August 2020, Davidson became a first year scholar at Sheffield Wednesday. He signed professional terms with the club on 1 July 2021. He made his professional debut in the EFL Trophy against Bradford City on 30 August 2022.

Career statistics

References

2003 births
Living people
English footballers
Sheffield Wednesday F.C. players